The 2019–20 Indian Super League season was the sixth season of the Indian Super League, one of the top Indian professional football leagues. The regular season began on 20 October 2019 and concluded on 14 March 2020.

Hyderabad replaced the disbanded Pune City, whereas Delhi Dynamos moved to Bhubaneswar and rebranded as Odisha.

Bengaluru were the defending champions, having won their maiden Indian Super League title by defeating Goa 1–0 in the 2018–19 final. However, both teams were knocked out in the semi-finals, with Bengaluru losing 3–2 on aggregate to ATK and Goa losing 6–5 on aggregate to Chennaiyin. On 14 March 2020, ATK beat Chennaiyin 3–1 in the final, becoming the first club to win three ISL titles.

On 29 November 2019, the AFC association ranking confirmed India's group stage spot in the 2021 AFC Champions League. As winners of the regular season, FC Goa took that spot along with the inaugural League Winners Shield trophy.

Teams

Stadiums and locations

Personnel and sponsorship

Head coaching changes

Roster changes

Foreign players

The number of foreign players allowed in the squad is maximum seven and a minimum of six. However, the maximum number of foreign players allowed on the pitch is five.

Regular season

League table

Results

Playoffs

Bracket

Semi-finals

Final

Season statistics

Scoring

Top scorers

Top Indian scorers

Hat-tricks 

Result column shows goal tally of player's team first.

Notes
(H) – Home team(A) – Away team

Assists

Cleansheets

Discipline

Player 
 Most yellow cards: 7
 Mandi (footballer) (ATK)
 Germanpreet Singh (Chennaiyin)
 Vinit Rai (Odisha)
 Diego Carlos (Mumbai City)
 Ahmed Jahouh (Goa)
 Brandon Fernandes (Goa)

 Most red cards: 1
 Dimple Bhagat (Hyderabad)
 Abdul Hakku (Kerala Blasters)
 Sourav Das (Mumbai City)
 Jitendra Singh (Jamshedpur)
 Tondonba Singh (Chennaiyin)
 Bikash Jairu (Jamshedpur)
 Souvik Chakrabarti (Mumbai City)
 Saviour Gama (Goa)
 Sahil Panwar (Hyderabad)
 Sarthak Golui (Mumbai City)
 José David Leudo (NorthEast United)
 Seiminlen Doungel (Goa)
 Thoi Singh (Chennaiyin)
 Vinit Rai (Odisha)
 Carlos Delgado (Odisha)
 Farukh Choudhary (Jamshedpur)
 Reagan Singh (NorthEast United)
 Ahmed Jahouh (Goa)
 Nishu Kumar (Bengaluru)
 Eli Sabiá (Chennaiyin)
 Mourtada Fall (Goa)
 Edwin Sydney Vanspaul (Chennaiyin)

Club 

 Most yellow cards: 57
 Mumbai City

 Most red cards: 4
 Chennaiyin

Average home attendances

Notes

Awards

Hero of the Match

ISL Emerging Player of the Match

Season awards

See also
 2019–20 I-League
 2019–20 in Indian football

Notes

References

External links

 
Indian Super League seasons
1
India